Dmitri Vladimirovich Soloviev (born July 18, 1989) is a Russian ice dancer. With partner Ekaterina Bobrova, he is the 2014 Olympic champion in the team event, the 2013 World bronze medalist, the 2013 European champion, the 2007 World Junior champion, and a six-time (2011–2014, 2016–2017) Russian national champion. They are also gold medalists at three Grand Prix events, the 2010 Cup of Russia, 2011 Cup of China, and the 2016 Rostelecom Cup.

Personal life
Dmitri Vladimirovich Soloviev was born 18 July 1989 in Moscow. In 2006, he married former single skater Ekaterina Lobanova, with whom he has a son, Alexander (born in 2010), but they are now divorced.

In December 2021, Soloviev was attacked by three men while defending his girlfriend Anna Sidorova and friends from abusive comments. He was hospitalised with a head injury, which occurred when he was pushed into a door.

Career

Early career
Soloviev teamed up with Bobrova in 2000. Elena Kustarova and Svetlana Alexeeva were their coaches from the beginning of their partnership. At the 2007 World Junior Championships, Bobrova/Soloviev placed first in the compulsory dance, original dance, and free dance, and won the gold medal.

2007–08 to 2011–12
Bobrova/Soloviev competed at their first senior Worlds in 2008, where they placed 13th. The following season they were not selected for the event.

During the 2009–10 season, Bobrova/Soloviev won the silver medal at 2010 Russian Nationals in December 2009, earning them their first berth to the European Championships in January 2010, where they placed 9th. They also qualified for the Olympics the following month where they finished in 15th. They also competed at their second World Championships and climbed to 8th in the rankings.

During the 2010–11 season, Bobrova/Soloviev won their first medal on the senior Grand Prix series – a silver at Cup of China. At their next event, 2010 Cup of Russia, they won their first senior Grand Prix title. In doing so, they qualified for their first senior Grand Prix Final, where they finished fourth.

At the 2011 Russian Championships, Bobrova/Soloviev finished first in both the short dance and the free dance to win their first national title. Following the event, they decided to drop their Delilah short dance in favor of a new one to Where I Want to Be which they debuted at the 2011 European Championships. They won their first medal at the event, silver. At the 2011 World Championships, they came in 6th.

In 2011–12, Bobrova/Soloviev won the gold medal at their first Grand Prix event of the season, 2011 Cup of China, with a score of 163.52 after placing first in both the short dance and in the free dance. They took the bronze medal at their next event, 2011 Cup of Russia, and then finished sixth at the Grand Prix Final. They repeated as Russian national champions and European silver medalists. Bobrova/Soloviev finished 7th at the 2012 World Championships.

2012–13 season
On 25 April 2012, Bobrova/Soloviev changed coaches to Alexander Zhulin and Oleg Volkov. They said they were learning a different technique, as well as changing their style. In their 2012–13 free dance, Soloviev plays the insane lover of Bobrova who herself begins to slip into insanity as he starts to recover. On the short dance, Soloviev said: "The story is that we are at a ball. In the beginning, we meet and have a dance together. The first part, the polka, is very playful, but when the music changes into the waltz, that's when we fall in love with each other and it's getting more serious. In the end, we realize that we can't be together because I'm too old and she is a young girl."

Bobrova/Soloviev started the 2012–13 season with gold at the 2012 Finlandia Trophy. Winning silver at both of their Grand Prix assignments, the 2012 Skate America and 2012 Cup of China, they qualified for the 2012 Grand Prix Final in Sochi, Russia. After a fall from Soloviev in their free dance, they finished 5th overall behind Italian ice dancers Anna Cappellini / Luca Lanotte. At the 2013 Russian Championships, they won their third national title.

Bobrova/Soloviev won the gold medal in their fourth appearance at the European Championships, narrowly edging out their teammates Elena Ilinykh / Nikita Katsalapov. They stepped onto the World podium for the first time at the 2013 World Championships in London, Ontario where they won the bronze medal. Named in the Russian team to the 2013 World Team Trophy, they withdrew after Soloviev aggravated a groin injury on 1 April and was told to rest for at least ten days.

2013–14 season
Competing on the 2013–14 ISU Grand Prix series, Bobrova/Soloviev won silver at the 2013 Cup of China and gold at the 2013 Rostelecom Cup before finishing fourth at the 2013 Grand Prix Final, behind Nathalie Pechalat / Fabian Bourzat. They won their fourth consecutive national title at the 2014 Russian Championships. Feeling their free dance was not working, they decided to return to the one from the previous season.

In February 2014, Bobrova/Soloviev competed at the Winter Olympics in Sochi. In the team event, they placed third in their assigned segment, the short dance, and Russia went on to win the gold medal. Bobrova/Soloviev ranked fifth in the separate ice dancing event. A month later, they traveled to Saitama, Japan for the 2014 World Championships. On 28 March, Soloviev sustained a groin injury during the morning practice before the short dance, causing them to withdraw. He returned to the ice cautiously in the second week of April.

2014–15 season
For the 2014–15 Grand Prix season, Bobrova/Soloviev were assigned to the 2014 Skate America and 2014 Trophee Eric Bompard. As a result of Soloviev's knee surgery, they withdrew from both events and decided to sit out the remainder of the season to allow him to recover fully.

2015–16 season
During the 2015–16 Grand Prix series, Bobrova/Soloviev won the bronze medal at the 2015 Skate Canada International and then silver at the 2015 NHK Trophy. These placements gave them the last spot at the final, ahead of compatriots Victoria Sinitsina / Nikita Katsalapov. They finished 5th at the 2015–16 Grand Prix Final in Barcelona, Spain. In late December, Bobrova/Soloviev were awarded their fifth national title at the 2016 Russian Championships held in Yekaterinburg.

On January 27–30, Bobrova/Soloviev won the bronze medal at the 2016 European Championships with a personal best overall score of 176.50 points. On 7 March 2016, Bobrova announced that she had tested positive for meldonium. Expressing "shock" about the test result, she stated that she had been aware of meldonium's addition to the banned list (on 1 January 2016) and had been careful to avoid products containing banned substances.

2016–17 season 
Bobrova/Soloviev started their season by winning the gold medal at the 2016 CS Ondrej Nepela Memorial. Competing on the Grand Prix series, they won two medals, first the bronze medal at the 2016 Skate America and then the gold medal at the 2017 Rostelecom Cup. These results qualified them to the 2016–17 Grand Prix Final where they placed 4th after placing 5th in the short dance and 4th in the free dance.

in December 2016 they won the gold medal at the 2017 Russian Championships. A month later they won the bronze medal at the 2017 European Championships after winning the short dance and placing 3rd in the free dance. They later competed at the 2017 World Championships where they placed 5th and at the 2017 World Team Trophy where their team won the silver medal.

2017–18 season 
Ekaterina Bobrova and Dmitri Soloviev are at a point in their career where retirement is on the horizon. An Olympic season is special for all skaters, but it is even more special if it might be the last competitive season.
Again Bobrova/Soloviev started their season by winning the gold medal at the CS Ondrej Nepela Trophy. This was their 2nd consecutive victory at the Ondrej Nepela Trophy. Competing on the Grand Prix series, they won two medals, first the silver medal at the 2017 Rostelecom Cup and then the bronze medal at the 2017 Cup of China.

In December 2017 they first won the gold medal the 2017 CS Golden Spin of Zagreb and then they won another gold medal at the 2018 Russian Championships. This was the 7th time that they had won the gold medal at the Russian Championships. A month later they won the silver medal at the 2018 European Championships after placing 4th in the short dance and 2nd in the free dance. At the 2018 Europeans they scored their personal best score of 187.13 points.

In February 2018 Bobrova/Soloviev placed 5th at the 2018 Winter Olympics after placing 6th in the short dance and 4th in the free dance. A week earlier they had won the olympic silver medal at the team event of the 2018 Winter Olympics. They later withdrew from the 2018 World Championships.

Programs

(with Bobrova)

Competitive highlights

(with Bobrova)

Detailed results
Small medals for short and free programs awarded only at ISU Championships. At team events, medals awarded for team results only.

References

External links

Official website

Russian male ice dancers
Figure skaters from Moscow
Living people
1989 births
Figure skaters at the 2010 Winter Olympics
Figure skaters at the 2014 Winter Olympics
Figure skaters at the 2018 Winter Olympics
Olympic figure skaters of Russia
World Figure Skating Championships medalists
European Figure Skating Championships medalists
World Junior Figure Skating Championships medalists
Medalists at the 2014 Winter Olympics
Medalists at the 2018 Winter Olympics
Olympic medalists in figure skating
Olympic gold medalists for Russia
Olympic silver medalists for Olympic Athletes from Russia
Competitors at the 2009 Winter Universiade